The Resident is an American medical drama television series that premiered on January 21, 2018. It appeared on Fox on Wednesday at 8 PM (ET) as a mid-season replacement during the 2017–18 television season. The series focuses on the lives and duties of staff members at fictional Chastain Park Memorial Hospital, with generally a critical eye into real life bureaucratic practices of the healthcare industry.

Created by Amy Holden Jones, Hayley Schore, and Roshan Sethi, the series was purchased by Fox from Showtime in 2017. In May 2017, Fox ordered the project to series, with a 14-episode season order. The series premiere was a lead-out to the Vikings-Eagles NFC Championship Game. In May 2021, the series was renewed for a fifth season, which premiered on September 21, 2021. In May 2022, the series was renewed for a sixth season, which premiered on September 20, 2022.

Cast and characters

Main
 Matt Czuchry as Conrad Hawkins: the titular Resident who is a senior resident internist and later chief resident at Chastain Park Memorial Hospital. In season 3, he also gets a job as the team doctor for Georgia FC. He and Nic get married and have a daughter, Georgiana Grace "Gigi" Nevin Hawkins, in season 4.
 Emily VanCamp (seasons 1–4; Recurring Season 5) as Nicolette 'Nic' Nevin: a nurse practitioner at Chastain Park Memorial Hospital and later Conrad's wife. She and Conrad have a daughter, Georgiana Grace "Gigi" Nevin Hawkins, in season 4. In season 5, Nic dies after suffering a traumatic brain injury in a car crash.
 Manish Dayal as Devon Pravesh: a second-year resident internist at Chastain Park Memorial Hospital. After the time jump in season 5, he becomes an attending at Chastain before leaving that position to focus on running clinical trials.
 Shaunette Renée Wilson (seasons 1–4) as Mina Okafor: a surgical resident at Chastain Park Memorial Hospital. She is very intelligent and does not care for anyone's opinion, which AJ Austin seems to find intriguing. In season 4, after losing a fight over her expiring visa, Mina decided to return to her home country of Nigeria willingly rather than be deported or continue to fight the deportation.
 Bruce Greenwood as Randolph Bell: Chief of Surgery, later CEO, at Chastain Park Memorial Hospital. He is demoted from both positions in season 3 by Red Rock and starts his own talk show, Ring the Bell. In season 5, he is diagnosed with multiple sclerosis.
 Melina Kanakaredes as Lane Hunter (season 1; guest season 2): a former oncologist at Chastain Park Memorial Hospital. She also owned her own medical clinics. She was arrested at the end of season 1 after it was revealed that she was giving her patients unnecessary chemotherapy in order to get paid higher premiums. She had deliberately killed a patient and framed Nic for it to cover up her crimes, and was later killed during season 2 by a vengeful family member of one of her over-treated patients after being let out on bail.
 Malcolm-Jamal Warner as August Jeremiah "AJ/The Raptor" Austin (season 2–present, recurring season 1): a cardiothoracic surgeon who joins Chastain Park Memorial Hospital at Bell's and Okafor's urging.
 Jane Leeves as Elizabeth Katherine "Kitt" Voss (season 2–present): an orthopaedic surgeon. In season 4, she becomes the new CEO after Chastain becomes a public hospital. She also marries Dr.Bell in Season 6 after the two of them began dating in Season 5.
 Morris Chestnut as Barrett Cain (seasons 3–4): a neurosurgeon, promoted by Red Rock to Chief of Surgery after they demote Bell. It is revealed that Cain is a former college football player who almost made it to the NFL before a career-ending injury that made him bitter. In season 4, Cain is hit by an ambulance while saving a woman's life and struggles to recover from his potentially career ending injuries while also facing a lawsuit for his actions during the COVID-19 pandemic. Cain also becomes close with Devon's sickle cell anemia patient Rose and they enter into a romantic relationship with each other. In season 5, he has left Chastain for a better paying job at Johns Hopkins.
 Jessica Lucas as Billie Sutton (season 5–present; Recurring Season 4): a neurosurgery resident at Chastain and Nic's close friend. In season 5, she becomes the new Chief of Surgery after the three-year time jump. In season 6, she and Conrad start dating.
 Anuja Joshi as Leela Devi (season 5–present; recurring season 4): a new surgical intern at Chastain who struggles with dyslexia while trying to prove herself in the operating room. After the time jump she is now a resident at Chastain, living with Devon after a four-year relationship and figuring out her life with the help of her twin sister, Padma.
 Kaley Ronayne as Kincaid "Cade" Sullivan (season 6; recurring season 5): an emergency physician. 
 Andrew McCarthy as Ian Sullivan (season 6; guest season 5) a renowned paediatric surgeon and Cade's estranged father.

Recurring
 Tasie Lawrence as Priya Nair (seasons 1–2): a reporter and Devon's former fiancée
 Michael Hogan as Albert Nolan (season 1–present): a doctor and the trauma attending of Chastain Park Memorial Hospital
 Violett Beane as Lily Kendall (season 1): one of Lane's chemotherapy patients
 Warren Christie as Jude Silva (season 1): a trauma surgeon
 Tasso Feldman as Irving Feldman (season 1–present): an ER doctor. He elopes with Jessica Moore in season 4's "Doors Opening, Doors Closing" after getting engaged to her in season 3.
 Jessica Miesel as Jessica Moore (season 1–present): a gossip-loving scrub nurse. She and Feldman get engaged in season 3 and then elope in season 4's "Doors Opening, Doors Closing."
 Jocko Sims as Ben Wilmot (season 1): an attending doctor.
 Patrick R. Walker as Micah Stevens (seasons 1–2): a teacher who is a repeat patient of Conrad's and Mina's former romantic interest.
 Steven Reddington as Bradley Jenkins (seasons 1–2): a former surgical doctor at Chastain Park Memorial Hospital.
 Catherine Dyer as Alexis Stevens (season 1–present): a Nursing Supervisor at Chastain Park Memorial Hospital.
 Vince Foster as Paul Chu (season 1–present): the Chief Anesthesiologist at Chastain Park Memorial Hospital.
 Denitra Isler as Nurse Ellen Hundley (season 1–present): the head ER nurse at Chastain Park Memorial Hospital.
 Michael Weston as Gordon Page (season 2): Founder and former CEO of Quovadis.
 Jenna Dewan as Julian Booth (season 2): former medical device representative for Quovadis.
 Julianna Guill as Jessie Nevin (seasons 1–2, special guest season 3): Nic's sister.
 Daniella Alonso as Zoey Barnett (season 2): a mother to two of Conrad and Nic's patients.
 Evan Whitten as Henry Barnett (season 2): Zoey's oldest son.
 Miles Gaston Villanueva as Alec Shaw (season 2): Former free clinic primary physician at Chastain Park Memorial.
 Corbin Bernsen as Kyle Nevin (season 2–present): Nic and Jessie's father.
 Christopher B. Duncan as Brett Slater (season 2): Kitt's ex-husband and father of her children.
 Radek Lord as Grayson Betournay (seasons 2–3): Bell's assistant.
 Mike Pniewski as Abe Benedict (season 2): AJ's mentor and an esteemed cardiothoracic surgeon.
 Kearran Giovanni as Andrea Braydon (season 3): A fitness teacher looking for investors for her fitness product. She and AJ Austin date during season 3, but they break up early in season 4.
 Geoffrey Cantor as Zip Betournay (season 3): Grayson's father and Bell's golfing partner.
 Michael Paul Chan as Yee Austin (season 3–4): AJ's adoptive father. In season 5, he's mentioned to have died.
 Erinn Westbrook as Adaku Eze (special guest season 2, recurring season 3): Mina's friend.
 David Alan Grier as Lamar Broome (season 3): AJ's biological father.
 Denise Dowse (season 3), Summer Selby (seasons 4–5) as Carol Austin: AJ's adoptive mother. In season 4, she developed terminal lung cancer, and passed away in season 5.
 Adriane Lenox as Bonnie Broome (season 3): AJ's biological mother.
 Rob Yang as Logan Kim (seasons 3–4): VP of Red Rock Mountain Medical and former CEO of Chastain; he is fired in the second episode of season 4.
 Shazi Raja as Nadine Suheimat (seasons 3–4): Devon's VIP patient and later love interest.
 Matt Battaglia as Bill Landry (season 3): The owner of Georgia FC and later a patient at Chastain who hires Conrad as his team doctor for saving one of his players' lives.
 Conrad Ricamora as Jake Wong (season 4–present): a plastic surgeon, amateur musician and Bell's former step-son who accepts a job at Chastain. In season 5, he has left the hospital, but he remains in Bell's life.
 Nichelle Hines as Nichelle Randall (season 4): A Congresswoman and a patient at Chastain who later becomes the Governor of Georgia and is instrumental in saving Chastain from closing.
 Cara Ricketts as Rose Williams (season 4): A dance teacher with sickle cell anemia and a patient of Devon's. While in physical therapy, she befriends Barrett Cain who is inspired by her no-nonsense attitude and refusal to give up in the face of tremendous odds but he resists forming a romantic relationship after the traumatic death of his ex-girlfriend on Cain's operating table. Rose undergoes an experimental gene therapy developed by an old friend of Devon's in an effort to cure her condition. The gene therapy ultimately proves to be successful and Rose is cured and starts a relationship with Cain.
 Stephen Wallem as Winston Robards (season 5)
 Aneesha Joshi as Padma Devi (season 5–present): Leela's free spirited twin sister who shakes things up in Leela's life when she comes to visit. A survivor of leukemia she has been infertile which has created in her a need to enjoy life after coming so close to death as a child which has led her down the path to become a Wellness coach and her sister as a doctor.
 Landon Ashworth as Donald Killian (season 6)
Remington Blaire Evans as Gigi Hawkins (season 5-present): Conrad Hawkins and Nic Nevin's daughter

Episodes

Production

Development
On August 5, 2016, it was announced that Showtime was developing a new original series, known as The City, pitched by executive producer Antoine Fuqua. The series was described at the time as

It was also announced that Amy Holden Jones would produce the series and co-write the pilot episode along with Hayley Schore and Roshan Sethi. The series, however, was never produced and on January 20, 2017, it was reported that Fox purchased the series from Showtime and ordered a pilot episode under the name The Resident. On May 10, 2017, the series received a season order of 14 episodes. The series premiered on January 21, 2018.  Phillip Noyce, an executive producer for the series, directed the first two episodes of the season after signing a multi-year deal with 20th Century Fox Television. The first season officially concluded on May 14, 2018.

On May 7, 2018, Fox renewed the series for a 13-episode second season and pre-production began on June 8, 2018. The second season premiered on September 24, 2018. On October 10, 2018, it was reported that Fox had ordered an additional nine episodes for the second season, bringing the total episode count to 22. On March 13, 2019, however, series co-creator Amy Holden Jones stated on her Twitter and Instagram accounts that there were 23 episodes in season 2.

On March 25, 2019, Fox renewed the series for a third season, which premiered on September 24, 2019. The season was originally planned to have 23 episodes, but COVID-related production shutdowns resulted in three episodes remaining unfilmed. As a result, episode 20 served as a makeshift third-season finale.

On May 19, 2020, Fox renewed series for a fourth season, which premiered on January 12, 2021. On May 17, 2021, Fox renewed series for a fifth season, which premiered on September 21, 2021. On May 16, 2022, Fox renewed series for a sixth season which premiered on September 20, 2022.

Casting

On February 21, 2017, Manish Dayal and Bruce Greenwood were the first to be cast in the series for the roles of Devon Pravesh and Soloman Bell, respectively. Greenwood's character name was later changed to Randolph Bell. Matt Czuchry, Emily VanCamp, Shaunette Renée Wilson and Melina Kanakaredes were later announced to be starring in the series as well. Moran Atias was also cast for the role of Renta Thorpe, CEO at Chastain Park, which was originally portrayed by Valerie Cruz in the pilot. However, when Merrin Dungey joined the cast, the producers saw Atias as a better fit for the role of the hospital's head of marketing. Dungey replaced her as the CEO and the character's name was changed to Claire Thorpe.

As the season developed, it was announced that Violett Beane was set to recur, and on April 30, 2018, Malcolm-Jamal Warner was reported to have a major recurring role in the final three episodes of the season.

On June 18, 2018, it was announced that Warner and other recurring cast member, Glenn Morshower would be promoted to series regulars for the second season. The following day, it was announced that Moran Atias, Merrin Dungey and Melina Kanakaredes would not be returning, and that Jane Leeves would also be joining the cast as a regular for the second season on a one-year contract.

On July 16, 2018, it was announced that Jenna Dewan is set to recur on season 2. It was later announced on August 27 that Daniella Alonso had also been cast in a recurring role for the second season. On October 15, 2020, Conrad Ricamora was cast in a recurring role for the fourth season. On December 18, 2020, Jessica Lucas joined the cast as a new series regular for the fourth season.

On April 21, 2021, it was announced that original cast member Shaunette Renée Wilson would be written out of the series towards the end of the fourth season, after her deciding to exit the series to explore new ventures. She was followed by Emily VanCamp, whose character was written out of the series in the third episode of the fifth season.

On June 4, 2021, Anuja Joshi was promoted to a series regular for the fifth season. On August 24, 2021, Stephen Wallem joined the cast in a recurring role for the fifth season. On September 15, 2021, Miles Fowler joined the cast as a new series regular for the fifth season, followed by Kaley Ronayne on October 19, 2021. On April 6, 2022, it was reported that Fowler exited the series after less than one season as a series regular. On July 11, 2022, it was announced that Andrew McCarthy was promoted to series regular for the sixth season, followed by Ronayne on July 14, 2022.

Filming
Primary photography for the series takes place in and around Atlanta, Georgia. Exterior and some interior shots of the High Museum of Art in midtown-Atlanta were used as the backdrop for the fictional Chastain Park Memorial Hospital. Some filming also took place in Conyers, Georgia, on a production set previously used for Fox's Sleepy Hollow. Filming for the first production block took place between March 20 and April 5, 2017. Filming on the second season began in July 2018. On March 14, 2020, production on the third season was suspended upon the outbreak of the COVID-19 pandemic.

Broadcast, streaming, and home video release
In the United States, new episodes are broadcast by Fox. Internationally, the series airs on Seven Network then later on Disney + in Australia, City (season 1) and CTV (season 2–present) in Canada, on Universal TV (season 1 and 2), Sky Witness (season 3) and Disney+ (season 4-present) in the United Kingdom and Ireland and on Star World in the Indian Subcontinent. In Latin America, the series is broadcast by Fox's Latin America counterpart. Episodes can be watched next day on the network's website. Hulu owns the SVOD rights to the series, and individual episodes, or the season as a whole, are available for purchase on Amazon and iTunes. The first season DVD set was made available for pre-order in June 2018 through Amazon and was released on October 2, 2018.

Reception

Ratings

Critical response
The review aggregator website, Rotten Tomatoes, reported an approval rating of 59% based on 22 reviews, with an average rating of 6.11/10. On Metacritic, the show has a weighted average score of 54 out of 100, based on reviews from 12 critics, indicating "mixed or average reviews".

USA Today rated the series 1/2 out of 4 stars stating "It's a shame, because it's a waste of the talents of Czuchry and VanCamp (Revenge), two usually appealing TV veterans" and "The Resident can't save itself". Meanwhile, TVLine rated the series a B+ and said: "The Resident takes a hard look at the thorny ethical issues surrounding today's health-care providers." The first season was also often compared to ABC's medical drama, The Good Doctor. The series was unpopular with some in the medical profession, with various sources calling it grossly unrealistic. According to Amy Holden Jones, however, #TheResident is by far the most respected show by doctors and nurses.

Awards and nominations

Notes

References

External links

 
 

2010s American workplace drama television series
2010s American medical television series
2018 American television series debuts
2020s American workplace drama television series
2020s American medical television series
English-language television shows
Fox Broadcasting Company original programming
Television series by 20th Century Fox Television
Television series by 3 Arts Entertainment
Television shows featuring audio description
Television shows set in Atlanta
Television shows set in Georgia (U.S. state)
Television productions suspended due to the COVID-19 pandemic